Home Farm Football Club is an Irish association football club based in Whitehall, Dublin. It was founded in 1928. The club joined the League of Ireland in 1972 after merging with Drumcondra. Following this merger they were briefly known as Home Farm Drumcondra. Between 1995 and 1999 they played as Home Farm Everton before a split within the club led to the formation of Home Farm Fingal (later Dublin City). The original Home Farm reverted to junior status.

Home Farm is perhaps best known for its youth system which has produced dozens of players who have gone on to play for clubs throughout the Republic of Ireland and the United Kingdom. In addition many have also gone on to represent the Republic of Ireland at international level.

History

Formation
In the mid-1920s when Leo Fitzmaurice, the brother of Trans-Atlantic aviator James Fitzmaurice, organised a street football league in the Drumcondra / Whitehall area of Northside Dublin. This league originally featured five teams – Drumcondra Road, Ormonde Road, Hollybank Road, Richmond Road and Home Farm Road. In 1928 the latter two, led by Don Seery and Brendan Menton Snr respectively merged to form Home Farm Football Club. Menton later became president of the Football Association of Ireland while Seery was the father of Ronan Seery, the founder of Dublin City. The new club began to play their home games at Griffith Avenue playing in black and gold stripes. However this was only because their first set of shirts were purchased at a jumble sale and these were the only colours available. By the next season, the colours were changed to blue and white hoops.

Academy Club
Home Farm soon established a reputation for developing schoolboys into senior international footballers. In 1936 when they won the Free State Minor Cup, the team included Johnny Carey. By 1937 Carey, together with Paddy Farrell and Kevin O'Flanagan, was one of at least three former Home Farm players who had become Irish internationals, having played for the FAI XI. Carey and O'Flanagan made their debut in the same game against Norway on 7 November 1937, in a qualifier for the 1938 World Cup. O'Flanagan even scored in the 3–3 draw. All three would also play for the IFA XI. Carey went on to become a legend at Manchester United and was the first of several Home Farm graduates who established themselves at the club. In 1953 Liam Whelan, one of the legendary Busby Babes and among the victims of the Munich Air Disaster, made the same journey.

During the 1960s Home Farm produced twenty full internationals including, among others, Paddy Mulligan. The club's senior team also gained some minor successes. They won the FAI Intermediate Cup on three occasions in 1963, 1967 and 1968 and finished as runners up in 1966 and 1970. In 1964 they also won the Leinster Senior Cup beating Dundalk in the final. Meanwhile, Home Farm Under 14s under coach Joe Fitzpatrick earned a place in the Guinness Book of Records for their match winning sequence of 79 games between 1968 and 1971.

League of Ireland
In 1972 Home Farm and their trustees, Brendan Menton Sr. and Don Seery, finally got a chance to field a senior team in the League of Ireland when they merged with Drumcondra. Drums were £6,000 in debt and regularly propping up the league table. After almost 20 years in charge, Sam Prole sold the club to the junior team down the road. As part of the deal Home Farm also gained Tolka Park as home ground. Home Farm also agreed to keep the famous Drums name alive by playing under the name Home Farm Drumcondra but, after just a year, they infuriated the Prole family by reverting to the name Home Farm.

In 1975 Home Farm won the FAI Cup for the only time. With a team managed by Dave Bacuzzi and including Noel King, James Higgins, Martin Murray and Dermot Keely, they beat Dundalk, Cork Celtic and St Patrick's Athletic in earlier rounds before defeating Shelbourne 1–0 in the final at Dalymount Park. As a result, they became the first amateur team to win the FAI Cup in forty years. The following season they competed in the European Cup Winners Cup, playing against French side, RC Lens. They drew 1–1 at home but lost the away leg 6–0.

Despite this cup success, their performances in the League of Ireland were poor and between 1972 and 1987, when they were relegated to the League of Ireland First Division, they never finished higher than ninth. Lack of league success, however, did not stop the club continuing to produce players like Ronnie Whelan. During the 1980s Whelan became an established player at Liverpool and was a key member of the Republic of Ireland team under Jack Charlton.

Home Farm Everton
In Home Farm linked up with Everton in a sponsorship deal which resulted in the club briefly becoming known as Home Farm Everton. As part of the deal, Everton got first choice of the best Home Farm players and in 1996 they signed Richard Dunne. At the end of the 1995–96 season Home Farm Everton finished third in the First Division and then beat Athlone Town in a promotion/relegation play-off and returned to the League of Ireland top division. During the subsequent season Steve Archibald briefly played for the club. However, after a poor performance against Derry City, Archibald was allegedly told to  "eff off home"  by then manager Dermot Keely. After just one season back in the top division, they were relegated. Keely subsequently guided the club to success in the League of Ireland First Division Shield in 1998. The club continued to play as Home Farm Everton until 1999.

Split

In 1999 when the sponsorship deal with Everton collapsed, Home Farm decided to abandon their League of Ireland ambitions. However Ronan Seery, the club's chief executive officer, persuaded the club to sell their franchise to him. This effectively resulted in a split within the club. Seery subsequently formed a new professional team, Home Farm Fingal. Fingal is an old name for an area corresponding approximately with Northside Dublin. They took Home Farm Everton's place for the 1999–2000 season before changing their name to Dublin City in 2001. Meanwhile, the amateur and youth sections began playing once again as Home Farm F.C. and their senior team entered the Leinster Senior League.

Home Farm U14s
Despite the decline of Home Farm's senior team, the U14s continued strongly, playing regularly in the Dublin and District Schoolboy League.

During the 1990s under coach Paddy Hilliard they went unbeaten for five years and under Gerry Garvan they were unbeaten for a further three years between 1999 and 2002. Along the way they won the Schoolboys FAI Cup twice. In 2002, Garvan took his team to play a Celtic youth team in Glasgow and Darren O'Dea scored twice as Home Farm won 2–0. O'Dea, Diarmuid O'Carroll, Gary Walsh and Gareth Christie were already being tracked by Celtic youth development officer, Tommy Burns, and all four were subsequently offered contracts. In addition Ipswich Town became the latest English club to recognise Home Farm's potential and they signed up goalkeeper Shane Supple, defender Michael Synnott and midfielder Owen Garvan. Another member of the team Chris McCann signed for Burnley.

Sponsorship deals

Leeds United
In January 2000 Home Farm announced an arrangement with Leeds United. At the time United featured several graduates of the Home Farm academy in their squad, most notably Gary Kelly, Ian Harte, Stephen McPhail and Alan Maybury. Under the arrangement, Leeds provided technical support to the Home Farm coaching team, led by Liam Tuohy and Home Farm featured the Leeds crest on their shirts. Another player who was on the books of both clubs as a junior goalkeeper was Nicky Byrne, later to find success as a singer with Westlife.

Renault
In February 2005 Home Farm unveiled a €1 million sponsorship deal with several groups, most notably Renault Ireland.

The aim of the investment was to establish the club as a major soccer academy on a European scale. It was planned for the money to be invested in the club over the following three years.
The Irish Department of Sports, Arts and Tourism, the Irish Youth Foundation and the club president, Tony O'Reilly also contributed to the fund.

Renault Ireland chairman Bill Cullen, the driving force behind the deal, and O’Reilly are former Home Farm players. As part of the arrangement Home Farm jerseys featured the Renault logo alongside the club's distinctive crest.

Portsmouth

In 2009, Home Farm agreed a deal with Portsmouth F.C. which has led to Carl Walshe and Chinedu Vine joining Portsmouth as first year scholars.

Notable former players
Dual Ireland internationals
   Johnny Carey
   Paddy Farrell
   Kevin O'Flanagan

Republic of Ireland internationals

Republic of Ireland under-21 internationals

League of Ireland XI players

Ireland national rugby union team internationals
  Kevin O'Flanagan
  Mick O'Flanagan
  Tony O'Reilly

Other internationals
  Steve Archibald
  Jamie Bosio

Managers

Celebrities
  Nicky Byrne − member of Westlife
  Bill Cullen – host of The Apprentice.

Sports officials
  Brendan Menton Snr – president of the Football Association of Ireland
  Kevin O'Flanagan – member of the International Olympic Committee

Notable former coaches/managers
  Seán Thomas (1960–1961)
  John McSeveney (1973)
  Tommy Eggleston (1973–1974)
  Dave Bacuzzi (1974–1984)
  Ray Treacy (1982–1990)
  Mick Lawlor (1984–86)
  Martin Bayly (1994–1996)
  Dermot Keely (1996–1998)
  Liam Tuohy

European record

Honours
Leinster Senior League 2
1960–61, 1963–64 
FAI Cup: 1
1974–75
League of Ireland First Division Shield: 1
1997–98
Leinster Senior Cup: 1
1963–64
FAI Intermediate Cup
Winners: 1962–63, 1966–67, 1967–68:  3
Runners Up: 1965–66, 1969–70: 2
FAI Junior Cup
1954–55: 1
FAI Youth Cup
Winners: 1935–36, 1936–37, 1943–44, 1947–48, 1950–51, 1951–52, 1961–62, 1964–65, 1967–68, 1982–83, 1984–85: 11
Runners Up: 1937–38, 1953–54, 1964–65, 1966–67, 1975–76, 1979–80, 1983–84: 7 
FAI Under–17 Cup
Winners: 1984–85, 1990–91, 1991–92: 3
Runners Up: 1980–81, 1983–84, 1985–86, 1988–89: 4
Milk Cup
Winners 1988: 1

References

External links
Official club website

 
Association football clubs in Dublin (city)
Everton F.C.
Former League of Ireland clubs
Former League of Ireland First Division clubs
1928 establishments in Ireland
Association football academies in the Republic of Ireland
League of Ireland B Division clubs
Leinster Senior League (association football) clubs
Association football clubs established in 1928